The Spirit is a live album by the English rock band Magnum, released in 1991 by Polydor.

Recorded during the Goodnight L.A. tour, the selection of recordings was made according to the band's live set. The band selected the recording that they were most happy with. Although it was originally intended to be a double CD covering Magnum's full set at the time, it was changed to a single disc to cut costs.

Track listing

Personnel
Tony Clarkin — guitar
Bob Catley — vocals
Wally Lowe — bass guitar
Mark Stanway — keyboards
Mickey Barker — drums

References

External links
 www.magnumonline.co.uk — Official Magnum site

Magnum (band) live albums
1991 live albums
Polydor Records live albums